Ozette may refer to:

Ozette Indian Village Archeological Site, the site of an archaeological dig in Washington in the United States
Ozette Lake, a lake in the state of Washington in the United States
Ozette River, a stream in the state of Washington in the United States
USS Ozette, the name of more than one United States Navy ship